The Waitangi Treaty Monument, also known as the Te Tii memorial, is registered with Heritage New Zealand (formerly known as the New Zealand Historic Places Trust) as a Category I structure.

The monument was built in circa 1880–1881. Its inscription shows the full text in its Māori version of the Treaty of Waitangi.

The monument was registered as a Category I heritage item by the Historic Places Trust on 19 March 1987 with registration number 71. It is located on Te Karuwha Parade in Paihia.

History 
In mid-1880, members of Ngāpuhi commissioned the Auckland-based stonemason company of Buchanan to construct a memorial commemorating the signing of the Treaty of Waitangi. The memorial foundation base was constructed out of Sydney sandstone (described as 'Sydney freestone' in contemporary reports of the time period), the material used for the memorial itself was Oamaru stone. Plaques bearing an inscription of the full text of the Treaty of Waitangi in Māori were placed on all four sides of the base as well as a further inscription that 512 chiefs had been signatories.

The memorial was unveiled on 26 March 1881. More than 3,000 Maori nationwide arrived for the unveiling of the memorial and a substantial meeting house or runanga whare. There was also a hui (gathering) to discuss three clauses in the Treaty of Waitangi with a view to setting aside past intertribal conflicts. At the time of the unveiling, the Governor-General Sir Arthur Hamilton Gordon had been asked to attend. However, the Minister of Native Affairs, William Rolleston had come in his place. Ngāpuhi leaders, expressed their disappointment but were satisfied Rolleston had come as the Governor-General's representative.

References 

Far North District
Treaty of Waitangi
Heritage New Zealand Category 1 historic places in the Northland Region
Monuments and memorials in New Zealand
History of the Bay of Islands
Bay of Islands
Obelisks